The Bandini GT 750 is a road car produced in 1955 by Bandini Cars in their Forlì factory. Although used for racing it was intended as a road car and used the chassis from the single seat 750 sport siluro with a tuned 747 cc 4-cylinder engine.

In 1957 the car gained first prize in the Competition d'elegance in the city of Rimini.

It started its racing career in 1959 running at famous racing circuits including Daytona and was entered by the Racemaster team with drivers Victor Lukens and Fred Haynes in the 1960 Sebring International Raceway 12 hour race where it was forced to retire after 27 laps with a broken radiator.

Chassis

The frame of the 750 Bandini GT came from the Bandini 750 sport siluro with a slight increase in size and the adoption of a rear anti-roll bar.

 Structure and material: chassis frame of elliptical section tubes made of special aviation grade steel.
 Suspension:
 Front: Independent by double wishbone with inclined hydraulic shock absorbers inside coil springs; Anti-roll bar.
 Rear: semi-elliptical leaf springs with vertical telescopic hydraulic shock absorbers; Anti-roll bar
 Braking system:
 Service: hydraulic, drum.
 Parking: transmission mechanically actuated.
 Steering: worm gear with vibration damper. Left hand drive standard, right hand drive optional.
 Wheels: Borrani Ray 12 inch.
 Tyre: 5.20 x 12 (white wall optional)
 Fuel tank capacity: 
 Transmission: Rear wheel drive with Cardan shaft to centrally positioned differential and half-shafts.
 Weight: bare chassis  
 Weight total:

Engine

The Bandini GT used the Bandini DOHC engine.

 Positioning: forward longitudinal, 4 cylinders in-line
 Materials and design: aluminium sump of 5 litres capacity. Aluminium alloy Double Overhead camshaft Head with 8 inclined valves set in hemispherical combustion chambers. Cast iron cylinder block.
 Bore: 
 Stroke: 
 Displacement: 747 cc
 Compression ratio: 8.4:1
 Fuel system: Twin double body 35DCO3 Weber carburetors.  
 Power:  @ 7000 rpm
 Lubrication: Carter geared oil pump, aluminium oil cooler.
 Cooling: liquid with centrifugal pump driven by pulley and belt, front mounted radiator.
 Gearbox and clutch: 4 speed + reverse, single dry plate clutch.
 Ignition and electrical equipment: Coil and distributor, 12 V electrical system.

See also
 Bandini Cars
 Ilario Bandini

References

External links

 Unique Cars International Register

Bandini vehicles
Sports racing cars
Cars introduced in 1955